Barroselas is a former civil parish in the municipality of Viana do Castelo, Portugal. In 2013, the parish merged into the new parish Barroselas e Carvoeiro. On the 2001 census, Barroselas had a total population of 3,799. The total area is 7.47 km2 which gives a population density of 508,6  inhabitants/km2.

SWR Fest
The area is probably best known internationally for the annual heavy metal festival SWR Barroselas Metalfest (aka Steel Warriors Rebellion or simply SWR Fest) which began in 1998. The event has grown steadily larger with each year - even sprouting its own smaller splinter events - and has played host to numerous bands from across Europe and the world.

References

Former parishes of Viana do Castelo